The Toronto Varsity Blues men's ice hockey team is an ice hockey team operated by the Varsity Blues athletics program of the University of Toronto. They are members of the Ontario University Athletics conference and compete in U Sports. The Varsity Blues senior team won the Allan Cup in 1921 and 1927, and won the gold medal for Canada at the 1928 Winter Olympics. The team is based at Varsity Arena on the University downtown campus in Toronto, Ontario. 

The Varsity Blues have won 39 conference titles in the OUA as well as 10 U Sports Championships: 1965-66, 1966-67, 1968-69, 1969-70, 1970-71, 1971-72, 1972-73, 1975-76, 1976-77 and 1983-84.

History

The Varsity Blues were founded in 1891, and are the longest continuously operated ice hockey program in the city of Toronto. The program currently includes only players enrolled at the University, however the Varsity Blues have historically had a junior ice hockey team for students, and a senior ice hockey team for graduates. 

Notable coaches of the Varsity Blues include Conn Smythe, Ace Bailey, Tom Watt, and Mike Keenan, and Lester Bowles Pearson later Nobel Peace Prize recipient and Prime Minister of Canada.

David Bauer played for the Varsity Blues during the 1945–46 season, before becoming a Basilian priest and then founding the Canada men's national ice hockey team in 1963.

Senior team
The Varsity Blues graduates were a successful OHA Senior A League team in the 1920s and 1930s. They won the J. Ross Robertson Cup as league champions in 1921, 1927, 1929, and 1930. Toronto also became Canadian national champions with their victories at the 1921 Allan Cup and the 1927 Allan Cup.

During the 1920 Allan Cup playoffs, Canadian Amateur Hockey Association (CAHA) president Frederick E. Betts expressed concerns that the Varsity Blues team had violated the rules by participating in both the Ontario Hockey Association (OHA) and the Canadian Interuniversity Athletics Union (CIAU) playoffs. At the 1920 general meeting, the CAHA debated the issue and decided that the team was eligible for the Allan Cup.

1928 Winter Olympics

The University of Toronto Graduates as the 1927 Allan Cup champions were chosen to represent the Canada men's national team in ice hockey at the 1928 Winter Olympics. Conn Smythe coached the team during the OHA season, but refused to go to the Olympics due to disagreements on which players were added to the team by the Canadian Olympic Committee. The Graduates went without Smythe, led by team captain Red Porter, and Olympic Committee member W. A. Hewitt, who oversaw the team's finances. The format of the Olympics hockey tournament saw the Canadians receive a bye into the second round, without any games in the first week. Despite the wait to play, the Graduates won all three games by scoring 38 goals and conceding none, to win the gold medal.

1928 Olympic roster:

Charles Delahaye
Franklyn Fisher 
Louis Hudson
Herbert Plaxton 
Hugh Plaxton
Roger Plaxton
John Primeau
Frank Sullivan 
Joseph Sullivan
Ross Taylor 
Dave Trottier

Some sources show the names of Norbert Mueller and John Porter as being on the Olympic roster, but those two names are not listed in the "Official" Olympic Winter Games guide.

Junior team
The Varsity Blues formerly operated a junior ice hockey team, that played in the OHA in the 1930s, but withdrew from the junior loop during the 1939–40 season. Former NHL players Hugh Plaxton, Dave Trottier and Dunc Munro all played for the Varsity Blues.

Season-by-season results

NHL alumni

List of National Hockey League alumni involved with the Varsity Blues. (seasons in parentheses)

References

Sources

External links
 Toronto Varsity Blues men's hockey website
Toronto Varsity Blues men's hockey history
 Statistics and standings archive

Ice hockey teams in Toronto
University of Toronto
U Sports men's ice hockey teams
Toronto Varsity Blues
Ice hockey teams representing Canada internationally